Toms River is an unincorporated community and census-designated place (CDP) located within Toms River (formerly Dover Township), in Ocean County, New Jersey, United States. As of the 2010 United States Census, the CDP's population was 88,791. It is the county seat of Ocean County. The area is named for Toms River, whose estuary flows through the community and empties into Barnegat Bay.

Toms River Township and the census-designated place are not co-extensive. In addition to the census-designated place, which includes all of mainland Toms River Township, Toms River Township includes two small CDPs: Dover Beaches North (2020 Census population of 1,277) and Dover Beaches South (1,331), both of which are located on the Barnegat Peninsula. As defined by the Census Bureau based on 2010 Census data, more than 96% of Toms River Township's area and of its population of 95,438 was located in Toms River CDP.

Geography
According to the United States Census Bureau, the CDP had a total area of 40.738 square miles (105.510 km2), including 38.947 square miles (100.871 km2) of land and 1.791 square miles (4.639 km2) of water (4.40%).

Demographics

2010 census

2000 census
As of the 2000 United States census there were 86,327 people, 31,674 households, and 23,470 families living in the CDP. The population density was 846.6/km2 (2,192.7/mi2). There were 34,375 housing units at an average density of 337.1/km2 (873.1/mi2). The racial makeup of the CDP was 93.36% White, 1.81% African American, 0.13% Native American, 2.54% Asian, 0.02% Pacific Islander, 0.98% from other races, and 1.15% from two or more races. Hispanic or Latino of any race were 4.65% of the population.

There were 31,674 households, out of which 32.3% had children under the living with them, 60.1% were married couples living together, 10.7% had a female householder with no husband present, and 25.9% were non-families. 21.5% of all households were made up of individuals, and 10.4% had someone living alone who was 65 years of age or older. The average household size was 2.66 and the average family size was 3.11.

In the CDP the population was spread out, with 23.8% under the age of 18, 7.3% from 18 to 24, 27.4% from 25 to 44, 24.8% from 45 to 64, and 16.6% who were 65 years of age or older. The median age was 40 years. For every 100 females, there were 92.7 males. For every 100 females age 18 and over, there were 89.0 males.

The median income for a household in the CDP was $55,659, and the median income for a family was $62,971. Males had a median income of $47,448 versus $30,763 for females. The per capita income for the CDP was $24,831. 5.6% of the population and 4.0% of families were below the poverty line. 6.6% of those under the age of 18 and 6.2% of those 65 and older were living below the poverty line.

References

External links
 Walking Tour of the Village of Toms River
 Toms River as settlement and Post Office address
  Toms River Census Count Updated, Ocean County Government Press Release 3/29/2001. Archived at archive.org. explains Ocean County's request for change in CDP. Accessed 7/12/2007

Toms River, New Jersey
Census-designated places in Ocean County, New Jersey

vo:Toms River (New Jersey)